Vicki Truitt (born February 18, 1954) is a Republican former member of the Texas House of Representatives for District 98. First elected in 1998, she served for fourteen years until she was defeated in the Republican primary election in 2012.

Truitt is now a lobbyist and represents various clients including retired teachers, mental health providers, law enforcement, and various business interests.

In 1984, Truitt established and still owns a small health care consulting company operated by her husband which focuses on medical staff development. She has worked for the medical staff of John Peter Smith Hospital, in administration at Parkland Memorial Hospital, and as a physician recruiter.

Truitt has long been involved in various community organizations serving northeast Tarrant County. She was a lifelong resident of Northeast Tarrant County (the area she represented in the Texas House) until 2014.

Truitt became noted in the wider popular culture in a segment of episode 14, season 1, of Last Week Tonight with John Oliver, where she, in a House session, noted Gary Elkins's conflict of interest at being opposed to bigger regulation of the payday loan industry while owning several payday loan stores himself (known as Power Finance Texas). The episode also notes she later became a lobbyist for ACE Cash Express, one of Elkins's competitors.

Committee assignments
 Pensions, Investments & Financial Services Committee (Chair)
 Public Health Committee
 Appropriations
 Federal Economic Stabilization Funding, Select

References

External links
Vicki Truitt's campaign website
Texas House of Representatives - Rep. Truitt
Texas State Directory profile
Texas Tribune profile & bio
Vote-TX.org profile
Texas Conservative Coalition profile
Vicki Truitt on Facebook

1954 births
Living people
Republican Party members of the Texas House of Representatives
Women state legislators in Texas
American lobbyists
People from Keller, Texas
21st-century American politicians
21st-century American women politicians